La Domenica del Corriere was an Italian weekly newspaper which ran from 1899 to 1989. It came out every Sunday free with Corriere della Sera, but was also sold separately. It was famous for its cover drawings, and its issues are still collected. In the period between 1952 and 1953 its circulation was 900,000–1,000,000 copies.

References

External links

Domenica del Corriere 
«La Domenica del Corriere» archives (1899-1950) at Biblioteca di Storia Moderna e Contemporanea

1899 establishments in Italy
1989 disestablishments in Italy
Defunct newspapers published in Italy
Defunct weekly newspapers
Italian-language newspapers
Newspapers published in Milan
Newspapers established in 1899
Newspaper supplements
Publications disestablished in 1989
Weekly newspapers published in Italy
Sunday newspapers